Zygfryd Kuchta (born 5 January 1944 in Diepholz, Germany) is a former Polish handball player who competed in the 1972 Summer Olympics and in the 1976 Summer Olympics.

In 1972 he was part of the Polish team which finished tenth. He played all five matches and scored seven goals.

Four years later he won the bronze medal with the Polish team. He played all five matches and scored five goals.

External links
profile 

1944 births
Living people
Polish male handball players
Polish handball coaches
Handball coaches of international teams
Handball players at the 1972 Summer Olympics
Handball players at the 1976 Summer Olympics
Olympic handball players of Poland
Olympic bronze medalists for Poland
Olympic medalists in handball
People from Diepholz
Medalists at the 1976 Summer Olympics